The Possessed is a 1965 Italian mystery film written and directed  by Luigi Bazzoni and Franco Rossellini  and starring Peter Baldwin, Virna Lisi, Pia Lindstrom and Philippe Leroy. It is based on the novel La donna del lago by Giovanni Comisso. The film was years later released on U.S. television as Love, Hate and Dishonor.

Plot
Bernard (Peter Baldwin), a well-known writer, arrives in a small Italian town near a lake to spend his winter vacation. He checks into an old hotel owned by Enrico and his daughter Irma (Valentina Cortese), secretly hoping to become reacquainted with their maid Tilde (he had developed quite a crush on her the last time he stayed there, and had even stalked her a few times).  He is shocked to hear that Tilde (Virna Lisi) committed suicide the previous winter, and then learns that she was pregnant. Apparently she not only ingested poison, but she also managed to slash her own throat.

Bernard refuses to believe that Tilde committed suicide and decides to discover what really happened to her. When Enrico's son Mario (Philippe Leroy) and his wife Adriana (Pia Lindstrom) arrive at the hotel, the two begin acting suspicious, silently walking around the lake at night. Enrico isn't too happy about Bernard snooping around the hotel either. Bernard becomes obsessed with learning what happened to Tilde and begins to experience daydreams, flashbacks and hallucinations.

Cast

Production
The Possessed was based on the 1962 novel La donna del lago by Giovanni Comisso. Giulio Questi was hired to write the screenplay. Along with directors Luigi Bazzoni and Franco Rosselini, a fourth uncredited writer was added to work on the film: Ernesto Gastaldi. For their contributions to the script, Gastaldi, Bazzoni, and Rosselini received 700,000, 500,000 and 250,000 Italian lire respectively. Questi received the highest pay, earning 3 million lire.

Release
The Possessed premiered at the Swiss Locarno Festival on 24 July 1965. It was released in Italy on 14 August 1965, where it was distributed by Telexport, a minor distribution company that only released the film in a limited area in Italy. The film grossed 100,116,000 Italian lire domestically. The Possesseds poor commercial performance prompted producer Manolo Bolognini to approach Sergio Corbucci to make a Spaghetti Western that would recoup its costs; this would become Django.

In the United States, the film was released straight to television by AIP-TV in 1972 under the title Love, Hate and Dishonor; unlike most of the company's catalogue, which were offered in packages for broadcast syndication, the film was presented as a standalone "special feature".

The Possessed was released by Arrow Video on Blu-ray Disc on April 2, 2019 in the United Kingdom. This release utilizes a 2K restoration of the film with Italian and English audio options as well as several special features, including an audio commentary by Tim Lucas and an appreciation of the film by Richard Dyer.

References

Sources

External links

Italian mystery films
1960s mystery films
Films directed by Luigi Bazzoni
1965 directorial debut films
1965 films
Films scored by Renzo Rossellini
1960s Italian-language films
1960s Italian films